Ralph Frederick Stockwell, QC (21 November 1885 – 17 October 1962) was a Canadian lawyer and politician. He was provincial treasurer of Quebec from 1932 to 1936 in the government of Louis-Alexandre Taschereau.

References 

1885 births
1962 deaths
Canadian King's Counsel
Lawyers in Quebec
Quebec Liberal Party MNAs
McGill University Faculty of Law alumni
Canadian Army officers